Cyphers is a literary magazine publishing poetry and criticism from Ireland and abroad. It was established in 1975 by Leland Bardwell (1922-2016), Pearse Hutchinson (1927-2012), Eiléan Ní Chuilleanáin, and Macdara Woods (1942-2018). Of the four, all but Ní Chuilleanáin (born 1942) are deceased. Bardwell retired in 2012; Woods continued working until the final weeks of his life — even reading submissions while in his hospital bed.

The Irish Arts Council has funded Cyphers entirely since its third issue (it provided half the required funding for the first two issues; six pounds of the remainder came from the widow of Patrick Kavanagh).

Cyphers started publishing following The Dublin Magazines closure and as The Lace Curtains penultimate issue was published. Titles considered by the editors for their new publication included Landrail, The Blackbird, and Waterhouse Clock. The husband of Ruth Brandt — who designed the lettering on the masthead of early editions — decided it. He asked the name of Ní Chuilleanáin's and Woods's black cat. She was called Cypher — a name borrowed from several of Woods poems — based on the Arabic word for "zero" and also referring to a code.

Though commonly thought to intend to support new writers, this was not the case at all.

See also
List of literary magazines

References

External links

1975 establishments in Ireland
Literary magazines published in Ireland
Magazines established in 1975
Poetry literary magazines